The women's marathon event at the 2020 Summer Olympics started at 06:00 on 7 August 2021 in Sapporo. Peres Jepchirchir of Kenya won gold in 2:27:20 followed by world record holder and Kenyan teammate Brigid Kosgei with silver, and American Molly Seidel winning the bronze medal in her third-ever marathon.

The race was moved north, from Tokyo to Sapporo because the latter is on average  cooler in August, as decided in 2019 by the IOC. The start had been moved an hour earlier to 06:00 for the same reason.

The gifts for the competition were presented by Sebastian Coe, United Kingdom; World Athletics President.

Background
This was the 10th appearance of the event, having appeared at every Olympics since 1984.

Qualification

This was the 10th appearance of the event, having appeared at every Olympics since 1984. Eighty-eight athletes competed.

A National Olympic Committee (NOC) could enter up to three athletes in the women's marathon if all athletes met the entry standard or qualify by ranking during the qualifying period (the qualification period for "Entry Standard" (2:29:30) was from 1 January 2019 to 31 May 2021, with a maximum quota per NOC of 3.). The limit of 3 has been in place since the 1930 Olympic Congress.

The standard was "set for the sole purpose of qualifying athletes with exceptional performances unable to qualify through the IAAF World Rankings pathway." Runners in the top 10 at the 2019 world championship, the top 5 at any IAAF Gold Label marathon, and the top 10 at the Marathon Major Series were deemed to have met the qualifying standard, regardless of actual time. The world rankings, based on the average of the best five results for the athlete over the qualifying period and weighted by the importance of the meet, will then be used to qualify athletes until the cap of 80 is reached. More than 80 athletes (after application of the 3 per NOC rule) have met the qualifying standard.

To be a qualifying performance, the course had to have been certified in the last five years by a Grade A or Grade B road course measurer. In order to be eligible for the qualifying standard time, the elevation decrease could not be more than 1 metre per kilometre. For world rankings, the elevation decrease could exceed that rate, but a correction would be made to the score.

The qualifying period was originally from 1 January 2019 to 31 May 2020. Due to the COVID-19 pandemic, the period was suspended from 6 April 2020 to 30 November 2020, with the end date extended to 31 May 2021. The world rankings period start date was also changed from 1 January 2019 to 1 December 2018. The qualifying time standards could be obtained in various meets during the given period that have the approval of the IAAF. The most recent Area Championships may be counted in the ranking, even if not during the qualifying period. In July 2020, World Athletics announced that the suspension period would be lifted for the road events (marathons and race walks) on 1 September 2020.

NOCs can also use their universality place—each NOC can enter one female athlete regardless of time if they had no female athletes meeting the entry standard for an athletics event—in the marathon.

Women's Marathon 
The 2016 Olympics champion Kenyan Jemima Sumgong did not defend her title due to a doping suspension.

Competition format and course
As for all Olympic marathons, the competition is a single race. The marathon distance of 26 miles, 385 yards (42.195 kilometers) was run over a course that started with two laps around Odori Park. The route next made a large loop (about half the marathon's length) through the streets of Sapporo, passing by Nakajima Park, Sapporo TV Tower, and Hokkaido University, and crossing the Toyohira River twice. The race then took two laps around a smaller (approximately ) section of the large loop. The finish line was back at Odori Park.

Records
The existing world, Olympic and area records were left untouched by this race due to its harsh conditions:

Schedule
All times are Japan Standard Time (UTC+9)

The women's marathon took place on a single day.

Results

References

Women's marathon
Marathons at the Olympics
Summer Olympics
Women's marathons
Women's events at the 2020 Summer Olympics
Olympics